Rainha is a Brazilian sports equipment manufacturing company based in São Paulo.

History 
It began in 1934 when the Saad & Cia company, using a new process in the Brazilian manufacturing market with sterilization technology, launched sports shoes on the market. In the following decades the brand, widely recognized by a "torch" in its logo. In 1978, Alpargatas S.A. purchases the brand.

In the early 1980s the brand gains scale and distribution with its iconic Mont Car, Iate, Bullit and VL 2500 models. Rainha stops being just an elite item and becomes a high-volume brand, choosing sports as its platform. It is the first sports brand to sign a sponsorship contract with Pirelli Santo André. In 1983, it becomes the sponsor of The Great Volleyball Challenge - Brazil vs. USSR, a friendly match between Brazil vs. USSR, at Maracanã Stadium.

In 2015 it becomes part of the BR Sports holding company, which is part of the Sforza Group, whose president is Carlos Wizard Martins.

Past sponsorships

Football

National Teams 
  Paraguay (1984-86)

Clubs teams 

  Londrina
  Atlético Mineiro (1981–1982)
  Náutico
  Taubaté

Volleyball

National Teams 
  Brazil

Clubs teams 
  Minas
  Pirelli Santo André

References

External links
 

Brazilian brands
Sportswear brands
Clothing companies established in 1934
Sporting goods manufacturers of Brazil
Clothing companies of Brazil
Manufacturing companies based in São Paulo